Colonial Man is the eighteenth studio album by South African trumpeter Hugh Masekela. It was recorded in New York and Chicago and released on LP and eight-track cassette on 30 January 1976 via the Casablanca Records label. The album's title song "Colonial Man", "Vasco Da Gama" and "Cecil Rhodes" express African anti-colonial sentiments. At the time of its release, it was referred to variously by reviewers as a concept album and a protest album.

Reception
A reviewer of Dusty Groove wrote: "A later album from Hugh Masekela – but still plenty darn hip, way more so than most of the other artists on the Casablanca label at the time! Hugh's South African groove is still very firmly in place here – mixed with a slightly warmer LA soul sound, but expanded with loads of great arrangements that get a lot more complicated than before – and which bring in some great keyboard and percussion bits. Sivuca makes a wonderful appearance on 2 tracks – using that blend of voice and accordion that sounds so great – and the whole record's got a depth and sense of soul that you'd never guess from  silly title and cover!"

Track listing

Personnel
Art direction, design – Gribbitt!, Stephen Lumel
Backing Vocals – Deborah McDuffie (tracks: 1 3 6), Maeretha Stewart (tracks: 1 3 6), Patti Austin (tracks: 1 3 6)
Bass, vocals – Yaw Opoku
Director – Stewart Levine
Drums (traps) – Papa Frankie Todd
Electric piano – Adaloja Gboyega
Accordion and voice - Sivuca (track 1)
Engineer – Rik Pekkonen
Guitar – "Jagger" Botchway
Guitar, vocals – Stanley Todd Kwesi
Mastering – Bernie Grundman
Photography – David Alexander
Saxophone, percussion, vocals – O. J. Ekemode
Shekere, percussion, vocals – Odinga "Guy" Warren
Talking drum, percussion, vocals – Asante
Trumpet, vocals – Hugh Masekela

Re-releases 
As of 2018 the album has not been released in its entirety on CD or as digital downloads. Compositions "Colonial Man" and "A Song for Brazil" were re-released on CD in 1998 on Verve Records as part of The Boy's Doin' It. "A Song for Brazil", "Colonial Man" and "Witch Doctor" feature on the 2018 posthumous compilation of original recordings: Masekela '66-'76.

References

External links

1976 albums
Hugh Masekela albums
Casablanca Records albums
Cultural depictions of Vasco da Gama
Cultural depictions of Cecil Rhodes